The Namibia national basketball team is the national basketball team in Namibia. It is governed by the Namibian Basketball Federation (NBF).

They have yet to qualify for the FIBA Africa Championship.

Competitive record

Summer Olympics
yet to qualify

World championships
yet to qualify

FIBA Africa Championship
yet to qualify

African Games

1965-2015 : Did not qualify

Commonwealth Games

never participated

Miscellaneous
There is an ongoing cooperation between the Namibian Basketball Federation and the German Deutscher Basketball Bund. There have been several events where German basketball coaches went to Namibia to teach basketball and support child education.

References

External links
Namibia Basketball Federation
Namibia Basketball Records at FIBA Archive

Men's national basketball teams
Basketball
Basketball in Namibia
Basketball teams in Namibia
1995 establishments in Namibia